Lipoyl amidotransferase (LipL (gene)) is an enzyme with systematic name (glycine cleavage system H)-N6-lipoyl-L-lysine:(lipoyl-carrier protein)-N6-L-lysine lipoyltransferase. This enzyme catalyses the following chemical reaction

 [glycine cleavage system H]-N6-lipoyl-L-lysine + [lipoyl-carrier protein]  glycine cleavage system H + [lipoyl-carrier protein]-N6-lipoyl-L-lysine

In the bacterium Listeria monocytogenes the enzyme takes part in a pathway for scavenging of lipoic acid.

References

External links 
 

EC 2.3.1